Syllonoma longipalpana is a species of moth of the family Tortricidae. It is found in the United States in South and North Carolina.

The length of the forewings is about 6.4 mm for males and 7.3-7.6 mm for females. The ground colour of the forewings is dark tan with scattered brown scales and three dark brown bands. The hindwings are dark brown.

References

Moths described in 1985
Sparganothini